Abdul Hamid Mohtat was a politician and military officer from Afghanistan who served as Vice President and Deputy Prime Minister of Afghanistan. He also served as Minister of Communications but was dismissed in April 1974 by Mohammed Daoud Khan. In June 1987,he became ambassador of Afghanistan to Japan.

References 

Vice presidents of Afghanistan
Ambassadors of Afghanistan to Japan